David John Stollery, III (born January 18, 1941 in Los Angeles, California) is a former American child actor and, as an adult, an industrial designer. He appeared in numerous Disney movies and television programs in the 1950s. He is best known for his teenage role as the loner Marty in the Spin and Marty television serials on the Mickey Mouse Club TV series in the mid-1950s.

At the age of seven, he was named Child Actor of the Year for his role in the Broadway production On Borrowed Time. He then appeared in several films, including A Connecticut Yankee in King Arthur's Court in 1949 and Where Danger Lives in 1950. In the early 1950s, Stollery appeared in various television programs, including I Love Lucy, Dragnet, My Friend Irma, The Red Skelton Show, and The Ray Milland Show. It was on the latter program, in the role of The Prodigy, that Walt Disney took notice of his acting and had the 14-year-old sign a Disney Studio contract to play the lead character of Marty Markham in the Spin and Marty serials televised on The Mickey Mouse Club between 1955 and 1957.

In 2000, Stollery and Tim Considine, his co-star in the Spin and Marty serials (they were eighteen days apart in age), made cameo appearances in The New Adventures of Spin and Marty: Suspect Behavior, a made-for-TV movie. A DVD version of the Adventures of Spin & Marty was released in December 2005 as part of the fifth wave of the Walt Disney Treasures series. On the 50th anniversary of the serial's premiere, Stollery and Considine were interviewed by Leonard Maltin as a DVD bonus feature about their experiences filming the series.

After his teenage years, Stollery decided not to continue acting as a full-time career. He studied at the Art Center College of Design, then became an automobile designer with General Motors and later Toyota. At Toyota, he designed the second generation A40 Series Toyota Celica in 1978.

Filmography

 Walt Disney Treasures: The Adventures of Spin & Marty (2005) DVD - interview with Leonard Maltin
 The New Adventures of Spin and Marty: Suspect Behavior (2000) - Original Marty
 Ten Who Dared (1960) - Andrew 'Andy' Hall
 Walt Disney Presents: Annette (1958) TV Series - Mike Martin
 Drango (1957) - Jeb Bryant
 The Gale Storm Show - Jonathan (1 episode, 1957)
 The New Adventures of Spin and Marty (1957) TV Series - (Marty Markham)
 Westward Ho, the Wagons! (1956) - Dan Thompson
 The Further Adventures of Spin and Marty (1956) TV Series - Marty Markham
 Storm Fear (1955) - David
 Hallmark Hall of Fame - Tommy (1 episode, 1955)
 The Adventures of Spin and Marty (1955) TV Series - (Martin) Marty Markham
 Her Twelve Men (1954) - Jeff Carlin
 Dragnet - Donald Rush (1 episode, 1952)
 No Pets Allowed (short, 1952)
 Jack and the Beanstalk (1952) - Donald
 I Love Lucy - Timmy Hudson (1 episode "The Amateur Hour", 1952)
 Darling, How Could You! (1951) - Cosmo (Charles) Grey
 Tales of Robin Hood (1951) - Robin as a Boy
 Stop That Cab (1951) (uncredited) - Charles Thomas
 Where Danger Lives (1950) (uncredited) - Dickie, boy patient
 Peggy (1950) (uncredited) - Little Boy in Library
 A Connecticut Yankee in King Arthur's Court  (1949, uncredited) - Billy

References

External links

David Stollery acting career prior to Spin and Marty in 1955.

1941 births
Living people
American industrial designers
American male child actors
20th-century American male actors